was a photographer who ran a photographic studio in Tokyo in the 1870s. Two of his photographs were within the collection of the mining engineer Benjamin Smith Lyman and are now within the Tokyo Metropolitan Museum of Photography.

References

 Nihon shashinka jiten (日本写真家事典, 328 Outstanding Japanese Photographers). Kyoto: Tankōsha, 2000. . Despite the English-language alternative title, all in Japanese.

Japanese photographers
Year of birth unknown
Year of death missing